The 1921 Cincinnati Celts season was their sole season in the National Football League. The team finished 1–3, and tied for thirteenth place in the league.

Schedule

 Games in italics are against non-NFL teams and do not count in the league standings.

Standings

References

Cincinnati Celts seasons
Cincinnati Celts
Cincinnati Celts